The Douglas N. Everett Arena is an indoor arena in Concord, New Hampshire, United States. It hosted the Northeastern Hockey League's New Hampshire Freedoms in 1979. The arena holds 1,341 people for hockey.

The arena is owned by the City of Concord and operated by the city's General Services Department. The arena was built in 1965 to designs by Manchester architects Koehler & Isaak. Operations were taken over by the City in the mid 1980s. The arena's mission is to provide a modern, safe, attractive, and well-operated multipurpose facility for the Concord community at rates which are competitive with other facilities in the region. 

From mid-September to mid-March the arena holds ice skating activities such as public skating, stick practice, and hockey games. From mid-March to mid-September the arena hosts shows and events. Roller skating is offered June-July.

Hockey 
Competitive A-level men's hockey plays on Monday and Tuesday evenings, while B-level men's hockey play on Sunday evenings and Tuesday and Wednesday mornings. For women's hockey, the Nor'easters play Fridays, and the Helicats play Wednesdays. Leagues are run by independent groups.

The Everett Arena hosts five high school hockey teams: Concord High School "Crimson Tide" Boys Hockey, Concord High School "Crimson Tide" Girls Hockey, Bishop Brady "Giants" Boys Hockey, Bishop Brady "Giants" Girls Hockey, and Bow High School "Falcons" Boys Hockey. On average, teams typically play 10 home games at the arena during the winter season in addition to playoff games at the end of February and the beginning of March. The Everett Arena also hosts the NHIAA Semi-Final Tournaments for both the girls' and boys' divisions. 

The Concord Youth Hockey Association (CYHA) runs youth hockey at the Everett Arena. CYHA offers learn-to-play hockey programs and travel programs for children ages 4 to 18. Programs run from September to March.

Spring and summer shows 
When the arena is not an ice rink, dry floor shows and events occur during the spring and summer. The arena is located just east of Interstate 93 at Exit 14. Power and water are available on site for exhibitors. A variety of shows and events are hosted at the arena, including book shows, craft fairs, flea markets, gun shows, home shows, and the Kiwanis Spring Fair.

References

External links
 Everett Arena official website
 Concord Parks and Recreation Department
 Concord General Services Department
 Concord Youth Hockey Association
 Kiwanis Spring Fair

Indoor ice hockey venues in the United States
Indoor arenas in New Hampshire
Sports venues in New Hampshire
Buildings and structures in Concord, New Hampshire
Sports in Concord, New Hampshire
Modernist architecture in New Hampshire